Radio Light is a listener supported, English and iTaukei language Christian, radio station in Fiji. The station broadcasts on the 104.2Mhz to the cities of Suva, Navua and Nausori. The station also broadcasts on line.

It is operated by Evangelical Bible Mission Trust Board the organisation which also operates Radio Nayajiwan in Fiji. Radio Light was launched on November 26, 1996, with the mission to carry the message of The Christ in Fiji.

References

English-language radio stations
Radio stations in Fiji
Christian Radio in Fiji
Christian radio